The Merețel is a right tributary of the river Raznic in Romania. It discharges into the Raznic in Predești.

References

Rivers of Romania
Rivers of Dolj County